Kouhu Township is a rural township in Yunlin County, Taiwan.

Geography

It has a population total of 25,454 and an area of 80.4612 square kilometers, including a section of coastline bordering the Taiwan Strait.

History
Kouhu's coastal waters were traditionally used in oyster farming, but in 1991 they were zoned for offshore industrial use.

Administrative divisions
The township comprises 21 villages: Chenglong, Dinghu, Gangtung, Gangxi, Guogang, Houcuo, Hukou, Hutung, Jinghan, Keliao, Kouhu, Luntung, Lunjhong, Pubei, Punan, Shueijing, Sialun, Siecuo, Taizih, Wubei, and Wunan.

Infrastructure
Kouhu is one of the area proposed by Taiwan Power Company for underground electricity cable passing through to make a way to Jianshan Village in Huxi Township at Penghu through submarine cable.

Festivals
 Qian Shui Che Zhuang Festival

Tourist attractions
 Chenglong Wetlands
 Yiwu Wetland

Transportation
Provincial Highway 61

See also
 List of Taiwanese superlatives

References

External links

 Kouhu Township Office, Yunlin County 

Townships in Yunlin County